NGC 499, also occasionally referred to as PGC 5060, IC 1686 or GC 289, is a lenticular galaxy in the constellation Pisces. It is located approximately 197 million light-years from the Solar System and was discovered on 12 September, 1784 by astronomer William Herschel.

The NGC 499 Group is named after the galaxy.

Observation history 
The object was discovered by Herschel along with NGC 495 and NGC 496. He initially described the discovery as "Three [NGC 499 along with NGC 495 and 496], eS and F, forming a triangle.". As he observed the trio again the next night, he was able to make out more detail: "Three, forming a [right triangle]; the [right angle] to the south NGC 499, the short leg preceding [NGC 496], the long towards the north [NGC 495]. Those in the legs [NGC 496 and 495] the faintest imaginable; that at the rectangle [NGC 499] a deal larger and brighter, but still very faint."

NGC 499 was later also observed by William Herschel's son John Herschel and independently found by Stéphane Javelle in 1899.

See also 
 Lenticular Galaxy 
 List of NGC objects (1–1000)
 Pisces (constellation)

References

External links 

 
 SEDS

Lenticular galaxies
Pisces (constellation)
0499
IC objects
00926
005060
Astronomical objects discovered in 1784
Discoveries by William Herschel